The Fairfield Titan was a giant cantilever crane at BAE Systems' Govan shipyard, and the largest such crane on the River Clyde until it was demolished in 2007.

History
The crane was built by Sir William Arrol & Co. at the Fairfield Shipbuilding and Engineering Company yard in 1911, and was first used to install machinery in HMS New Zealand (1911).

The Titan was last used six weeks before its demolition, assembling a Type 45 destroyer. Despite being category A listed, permission was granted for its removal as it was hindering development of the yard, and it was dismantled over a period of three weeks and recycled.

The crane features in the song Shipyard Apprentice by Scottish traditional music group Battlefield Band.

Design

References

External links
 Demantling of the 'Fairfield' Titan Crane, Govan, Glasgow (Flickr gallery)

Individual cranes (machines)
Buildings and structures in Glasgow
Govan
Buildings and structures completed in 1911
Buildings and structures demolished in 2007